"Blackberry Molasses" is a song  performed by American contemporary R&B group Mista. It is the opening track on their eponymous debut album and serves as the album's first single. The song was the group's highest chart appearance on the Billboard Hot 100, peaking at #53 in 1996.

Music video

The music video for the song was directed by Hype Williams.

Charts

Weekly charts

Year-end charts

References

External links
 
 

1996 songs
1996 debut singles
East West Records singles
Mista (band) songs
Music videos directed by Hype Williams
Song recordings produced by Organized Noize
Songs written by Sleepy Brown
Contemporary R&B ballads